The Cluster Lensing And Supernova survey with Hubble (CLASH) was a program on the Hubble Space Telescope to observe 25 massive galaxy clusters. CLASH was one of three programs selected (along with CANDELS and PHAT) in the first class of Hubble multi-cycle treasury programs, which were designed to tackle large questions unanswerable through normal observations. Observations for CLASH were conducted between November 2010 and July 2013. CLASH was led by principal investigator Marc Postman, and had a science team of over 40 researchers.

Primary observations for CLASH were conducted on the Hubble Space Telescope with the Advanced Camera for Surveys (ACS) and Wide Field Camera 3 (WFC3). Images were taken in 16 filters, which were selected to maximize the ability to detect distant galaxies behind each cluster. Twenty of the observed clusters were selected due to their relaxed morphology in X-ray observations, while the other five were chosen due to their strength as gravitational lenses.

History

As of November 2012, the CLASH has surveyed 20 clusters out of the 25. One of the galaxy clusters, MACS J0647+7015 was found to have gravitationally lensed the most distant galaxy (MACS0647-JD) then ever imaged, in 2012.

In 2013, one study utilizing CLASH data found that RX J1347.5-1145 had intense gravitational bending of light such that 8 images of the same object were detected. (See Gravitational lensing)

Clusters under observation
List of clusters is:

Notes

References

Astronomical surveys
Observational astronomy